"Camelot" is a single by American rapper NLE Choppa, released on September 13, 2019. It is his second highest-charting song following "Shotta Flow", peaking at number 37 on the Billboard Hot 100. It is the second single from his debut studio album Top Shotta.

Music video
The music video was released on September 12, 2019, and was directed by Cole Bennett. The music video starts with NLE Choppa doing some push-ups while holding weights, then he gets up, grabs a shirt and walks out of a bedroom, then goes into a room, putting on the shirt. Offscreen, he walks out a room with the shirt on, then walks out the door. NLE Choppa then gives some people on his porch a high five, walks away with them following him on a pathway, then he goes on the road and some members of the Opps gang appear. Both groups go towards each other, and then NLE Choppa beats up one member, as the other people of his group beat up the other group, then the camera points on the floor, with NLE Choppa and his group stomping out one, then he falls backwards and everyone else starts running from the police, who are right up to NLE Choppa. He then starts running, then flips them off, then running towards a lemonade stand run by a kid. He then takes the cup without paying, then runs into a house, as wanted posters appear on screen. He then comes out with a afro and a mustache, walking up to a woman holding a popsicle, hugging her for a bit, then waves to someone off-screen, as a police officer who doesn't know that NLE Choppa is right there, runs past him. Afterwards, NLE Choppa takes off his disguise as he tries to get a popsicle, right in front of the police. He then runs around the ice cream truck and then eats his popsicle.

Remix 
The remix of the song, featuring BlocBoy JB, Yo Gotti, and Moneybagg Yo, was released on December 6, 2019.

Charts

Weekly charts

Year-end charts

Certifications

References

2019 singles
2019 songs
NLE Choppa songs
Warner Records singles
Music videos directed by Cole Bennett
Songs written by NLE Choppa